Reginald Arthur Lay Carter (6 December 1886, Southwold, Blything, East Suffolk – 24 April 1949 in Cuckfield, Sussex) was a British cartoonist.

Carter created the cartoon ostrich Big Eggo that appeared on the front cover of the first Beano. On 30 July 1938, the cover strip featuring Big Eggo was drawn by Carter. Carter worked for the Beano drawing Big Eggo and other strips until his death in 1949.
Also famous for two sets of humorous postcards entitled Sorrows of Southwold. These affectionately caricatured the three foot gauge Southwold Railway, which was noted for its idiosyncratic locomotives, carriages and leisurely mode of operation.

References
 https://www.lambiek.net/artists/c/carter_reg.htm

External links

1886 births
1949 deaths
British cartoonists
British comics artists
The Beano people